The crisis of the Roman Republic was an extended period of political instability and social unrest from about 134 BC to 44 BC that culminated in the demise of the Roman Republic and the advent of the Roman Empire.

The causes and attributes of the crisis changed throughout the decades, including the forms of slavery, brigandage, wars internal and external, overwhelming corruption, land reform, the invention of excruciating new punishments, the expansion of Roman citizenship, and even the changing composition of the Roman army.

Modern scholars also disagree about the nature of the crisis.  Traditionally, the expansion of citizenship (with all its rights, privileges, and duties) was looked upon negatively by Sallust, Gibbon, and others of their schools, because it caused internal dissension, disputes with Rome's Italian allies, slave revolts, and riots. However, other scholars have argued that as the Republic was meant to be res publica – the essential thing of the people – the poor and disenfranchised cannot be blamed for trying to redress their legitimate and legal grievances.

Arguments on a single crisis 

More recently, beyond arguments about when the crisis of the Republic began (see below), there also have been arguments on whether there even was a crisis or multiple ones. Harriet Flower, in 2010, proposed a different paradigm encompassing multiple "republics" for the general whole of the traditional republican period with attempts at reform rather than a single "crisis" occurring over a period of eighty years. Instead of a single crisis of the late Republic, Flower proposes a series of crises and transitional periods (excerpted only to the chronological periods after 139 BC):

Each different republic had different circumstances and while overarching themes can be traced, "there was no single, long republic that carried the seeds of its own destruction in its aggressive tendency to expand and in the unbridled ambitions of its leading politicians". The implications of this view put the fall of the republic in a context based around the collapse of the republican political culture of the nobiles and emphasis on Sulla's civil war followed by the fall of Sulla's republic in Caesar's civil war.

Dating the crisis

For centuries, historians have argued about the start, specific crises involved, and end date for the crisis of the Roman Republic.  As a culture (or "web of institutions"), Florence Dupont and Christopher Woodall wrote, "no distinction is made between different periods." However, referencing Livy's opinion in his History of Rome, they assert that Romans lost liberty through their own conquests'  "morally undermining consequences."

Arguments for an early start-date (c. 134 to 73 BC)
Von Ungern-Sternberg argues for an exact start date of 10 December 134 BC, with the inauguration of Tiberius Gracchus as tribune, or alternately, when he first issued his proposal for land reform in 133 BC. Appian of Alexandria wrote that this political crisis was "the preface to ... the Roman civil wars". Velleius commented that it was Gracchus' unprecedented standing for re-election as tribune in 133 BC, and the riots and controversy it engendered, which started the crisis:

In any case, the assassination of Tiberius Gracchus in 133 BC marked "a turning point in Roman history and the beginning of the crisis of the Roman Republic."

Barbette S. Spaeth specifically refers to "the Gracchan crisis at the beginning of the Late Roman Republic ...".

Nic Fields, in his popular history of Spartacus, argues for a start date of 135 BC with the beginning of the First Servile War in Sicily. Fields asserts:

The start of the Social War (91–87 BC), when Rome's nearby Italian allies rebelled against her rule, may be thought of as the beginning of the end of the Republic. Fields also suggests that things got much worse with the Samnite engagement at the Battle of the Colline Gate in 82 BC, the climax of the war between Sulla and the supporters of Gaius Marius.

Barry Strauss argues that the crisis really started with "The Spartacus War" in 73 BC, adding that, because the dangers were unappreciated, "Rome faced the crisis with mediocrities".

Arguments for a later start date (69 to 44 BC)
Pollio and Ronald Syme date the Crisis only from the time of Julius Caesar in 60 BC. Caesar's crossing of the Rubicon, a river marking the northern boundary of Roman Italy, with his army in 49 BC, a flagrant violation of Roman law, has become the clichéd point of no return for the Republic, as noted in many books, including Tom Holland's Rubicon: The Last Years of the Roman Republic.

Arguments for an end date (49 to 27 BC)
The end of the Crisis can likewise either be dated from the assassination of Julius Caesar on 15 March 44 BC, after he and Sulla had done so much "to dismantle the government of the Republic," or alternately when Octavian was granted the title of Augustus by the Senate in 27 BC, marking the beginning of the Roman Empire. The end could also be dated earlier, to the time of the constitutional reforms of Julius Caesar in 49 BC.

History

Gracchi Brothers

Tiberius Gracchus took office as a tribune of the plebs in late 134 BC while "everything in the Roman Republic seemed to be in fine working order." There were a few apparently minor problems, such as "the annoyance of a slave revolt in Sicily" (the First Servile War).

At the same time, Roman society was a highly stratified class system whose divisions were bubbling below the surface. This system consisted of noble families of the senatorial rank, the knight or equestrian class, citizens (grouped into two or three classes depending on the time period - self-governing allies of Rome, landowners, and plebs or tenant freemen), non-citizens who lived outside of southwestern Italy, and at the bottom, slaves.  By law, only men who were citizens could vote in certain assemblies, and only those men who owned a certain amount of real property could serve in the military, which would gain them social prestige and additional benefits of citizenship. The government owned large tracts of farmland (ager publicus) that it had gained through conquest or escheat (acquisition from owners who had died without heirs); this it rented out to large landholders who used their slaves to till it or who sub-leased it to small tenant farmers. There was some social mobility and limited suffrage. The plebs (or plebeians) were a socio-economic class, but also had possible origins as an ethnic group with its own cult to the goddess Ceres, and ultimately, were a political party during much of the Roman Republic. This social system had been stable after the Conflict of the Orders, since economically both the patricians and the plebeians were relatively both well off. Italy was dominated by small landowners. However, sometime after the Punic Wars, this changed due to various factors. Partly due to the availability of cheap grain coming into the Roman food supply, as well as the social displacement caused to farmers who had to serve on long foreign campaigns using their own financial resources and often having to sell out, the countryside came to be dominated by large estates (latifundia) owned by the Senatorial order. This led to a population explosion in Rome itself, with the plebeians clinging desperately to survival while the patricians lived in splendor. This income inequality severely threatened the constitutional arrangements of the Republic, since all soldiers had to be property owners, and gradually property owning was being limited to a small Senate, rather than being evenly distributed across the Roman population.

Beginning in 133 BC, Gracchus tried to redress the grievances of displaced smallholders. He bypassed the Roman senate and used the plebeian assembly to pass a law limiting the amount of land belonging to the state that any individual could farm. This would have resulted in the breakup of the large plantations maintained by the rich on public land and worked by slaves.

Gracchus' moderate plan of agrarian reform was motivated "to increase the number of Roman citizens who owned land and consequently the number who would qualify as soldiers according to their census rating." The plan included a method to quiet title, and had a goal of increasing the efficiency of farmland, while doling out small parcels of land to tenant farmers, his populist constituency. Gracchus used a law that had been in place for over a century, the lex Hortensia of 287 BC, which allowed the Plebeian Council to bypass the Senate. However, another tribune, Marcus Octavius, used his veto to scuttle the plan. It was widely believed that the rich Senators had bribed Octavius to veto the proposal.

The crisis escalated: Gracchus pushed the assembly to impeach and remove Octavius; the Senate denied funds to the commission needed for land reform; Gracchus then tried to use money out of a trust fund left by Attalus III of Pergamum; and the Senate blocked that, too. At one point, Gracchus had "one of his freedmen... drag Octavius from the speaker's platform." This assault violated the Lex sacrata, which prohibited people of lower status from physically violating a person of higher class. Rome's unwritten constitution hampered reform. So Gracchus sought re-election to his one-year term, which was unprecedented in an era of strict term limits. The oligarchic nobles responded by murdering Gracchus. Because Gracchus had been highly popular with the poor, and he had been murdered while working on their behalf, mass riots broke out in the city in reaction to the assassination.

Barbette Stanley Spaeth believed that he was killed because:

Spaeth asserts that Ceres' roles as (a) patron and protector of plebeian laws, rights and Tribunes and (b) "normative/liminal" crimes, continued throughout the Republican era. These roles were "exploited for the purposes of political propaganda during the Gracchan crisis...." Ceres' Aventine Temple served the plebeians as cult centre, legal archive, treasury, and court of law, founded contemporaneously with the passage of the Lex sacrata; the lives and property of those who violated this law were forfeit to Ceres, whose judgment was expressed by her aediles. The official decrees of the Senate (senatus consulta) were placed in her Temple, under her guardianship; Livy bluntly states this was done so that the consuls could no longer arbitrarily tamper with the laws of Rome. The Temple might also have offered asylum for those threatened with arbitrary arrest by patrician magistrates. Ceres was thus the patron goddess of Rome's written laws; the poet Vergil later calls her legifera Ceres (Law-bearing Ceres), a translation of Demeter's Greek epithet, thesmophoros. Those who approved the murder of Tiberius Gracchus in 133 BC justified his death as punishment for his offense against the Lex sacrata of the goddess Ceres: those who deplored this as murder appealed to Gracchus' sacrosanct status as tribune under Ceres' protection. In 70 BC, Cicero refers to this killing in connection with Ceres' laws and cults.

Rather than attempting to atone for the murder, the Senate used a mission to Ceres' temple at Henna (in Sicily) to justify his execution.

About nine years later Tiberius's younger brother, Gaius, passed more radical reforms. In addition to settling the poor in colonies on land conquered by Rome, he passed the lex frumentaria, which gave the poor the right to buy grain at subsidized prices. The agrarian reforms were only partially implemented by the commission; yet Gracchi colonies were set up in both Italy and Carthage.

Some of Gaius' followers caused the death of a man; many historians contend they were attacked and were acting in self-defense. In any case, the death was used by Gaius Gracchus's political rival, Lucius Opimius, to suspend the constitution again with another senatus consultum ultimum. In the past, the senate eliminated political rivals either by establishing special judicial commissions or by passing a senatus consultum ultimum ("ultimate decree of the senate"). Both devices allowed the senate to bypass the ordinary due process rights that all citizens had. Gaius fled, but he was also probably murdered by the oligarchs. According to one ancient source, Gaius was not killed directly by them, but ordered his slave Philocrates to do the deed in a murder-suicide.

Gaius Marius and Sulla

The next major reformer of the time was Gaius Marius, who like the Gracchi, was a populist. Unlike them, he was also a general. He abolished the property requirement for becoming a soldier during the Jugurthine War, when the Roman army was very low on manpower and had difficulty maintaining the conflict. The poor enlisted in large numbers. This opening of the Army's ranks to the capite censi enfranchised the plebs, thus creating an esprit de corps in the enlarged army. Some elites complained that the army now became unruly due to the commoners in its ranks, but some modern historians have claimed that this was without good cause:

Marius employed his soldiers to defeat an invasion by the Germanic Cimbri and Teutons. His political influence and military leadership allowed him to obtain six terms as consul in 107, and 103 to 99 BC, an unprecedented honour. However, on 10 December 100 BC the senate declared another senatus consultum ultimum, this time in order to bring down Lucius Appuleius Saturninus, a radical tribune in the mould of the Gracchi who had been inciting violence in Rome on behalf of Marius' interests. The Senate ordered Marius to put down Saturninus and his supporters, who had taken defensive positions on the Capitol. Marius proceeded to do this, but imprisoned Saturninus inside the Curia Hostilia, intending it seems to keep him alive. However, a senatorial mob lynched the tribune by climbing atop the Senate House and throwing dislodged roof tiles down onto Saturninus and his supporters below.

Sulla, who was appointed as Marius' quaestor in 107, later contested with Marius for supreme power. In 88, the senate awarded Sulla the lucrative and powerful post of commander in the war against Mithridates over Marius. However, Marius managed to secure the position through political deal-making with Publius Sulpicius Rufus. Sulla initially went along, but finding support among his troops, seized power in Rome and marched to Asia Minor with his soldiers anyway. There, he fought a largely successful military campaign and was not persecuted by the senate. Marius himself launched a coup with Cinna in Sulla's absence and put to death some of his enemies. He died soon after.

Sulla made peace with Rome's enemies in the east and began to arrange for his return to Rome. Cinna, Marius's populist successor, was killed by his own men as they moved to meet Sulla on foreign soil. When Sulla heard of this, he ceased negotiations with Rome and openly rebelled in 84. Invading the peninsula, he was joined by many aristocrats including Crassus and Pompey, and defeated all major opposition within a year. He began a dictatorship and purged the state of many populists through proscription. A reign of terror followed in which some innocents were denounced just so their property could be seized for the benefit of Sulla's followers. Sulla's coup resulted in a major victory for the oligarchs. He reversed the reforms of the Gracchi and other populists, stripped the tribunes of the people of much of their power, and returned authority over the courts to the senators.

First Triumvirate

Pompey the Great, the next major leader who aggravated the crisis, was born Gnaeus Pompeius, but took his own cognomen of Magnus ("the Great"). Pompey as a young man was allied to Sulla, but in the consular elections of 78 BC, he supported Lepidus against Sulla's wishes.  When Sulla died later that year, Lepidus revolted, and Pompey suppressed him on behalf of the senate. Then he asked for proconsular imperium in Hispania, to deal with the populares general Quintus Sertorius, who had held out for the past three years against Quintus Caecilius Metellus Pius, one of Sulla's most able generals.

Pompey's career seems to have been driven by desire for military glory and disregard for traditional political constraints. Pompey served next to Crassus and Julius Caesar as part of the first triumvirate of Rome, however, before this, the Roman aristocracy turned him down— as they were beginning to fear the young, popular and successful general. Pompey refused to disband his legions until his request was granted. The senate acceded, reluctantly granted him the title of proconsul and powers equal to those of Metellus, and sent him to Hispania.

Pompey infamously wiped out what remained of Spartacus' troops in 71 BC, who had been pinned down by Crassus. He received Rome's highest honor, the triumph, while Crassus the lesser honor of an ovation, which hurt Crassus' pride.

In 69 BC, he conquered Syria, defeated King Tigranes of Armenia, and replaced one puppet king, Seleucus VII Philometor with his brother Antiochus XIII Asiaticus. Four years later, he deposed the monarchy, replacing it with a governor. This not only finished off the Seleucids, but brought in thousands of slaves and strange peoples, including the Judeans, to Rome, thus creating the Jewish diaspora. 

While many of Pompey's reckless actions ultimately increased discord in Rome, his unlucky alliance with Crassus and Caesar is cited as being especially dangerous to the Republic. In January 49 B.C., Caesar led his legions across the Rubicon River from Cisalpine Gaul to Italy, thus declaring war against Pompey and his forces. In August 48 B.C., with Pompey in pursuit, Caesar paused near Pharsalus, setting up camp at a strategic location. When Pompey's senatorial forces fell upon Caesar's smaller army, they were entirely routed, and Pompey fled to Egypt. Pompey hoped that King Ptolemy, his former client, would assist him, but the Egyptian king feared offending the victorious Caesar. On 28 September, Pompey was invited to leave his ships and come ashore at Pelusium. As he prepared to step onto Egyptian soil, he was treacherously struck down and killed by an officer of Ptolemy.

Second Triumvirate

See also
 Constitutional crisis
 Crisis of the Third Century
 Damnatio memoriae
 Democratic backsliding
 Fall of the Western Roman Empire
 The History of the Decline and Fall of the Roman Empire by Edward Gibbon

References

Major sources and further reading

External links
  (Schmitz and Zumpt, 1848): Bellum Iugurthinum

Foreign relations of ancient Rome
History of the Roman Republic
Roman Republican civil wars
Slavery in ancient Rome
Social class in ancient Rome
2nd century BC in the Roman Republic
1st century BC in the Roman Republic